Major General Henry Conyngham of Slane Castle (before 1681–1706) was an Irish soldier and politician.

He was a Member of Parliament in the Parliament of Ireland for Killybegs in 1692-93 and for Donegal County in 1695-99 and 1703-06.

Conyngham served during the reign of James II as a captain in Mountjoy's Regiment. He was promoted lieutenant-colonel of Robert Echlin's (formerly Sir Albert Conyngham's) Regiment of Dragoons on 31 December 1691 and appointed colonel of a newly raised regiment of dragoons on 1 February 1693. He was promoted to brigadier-general on 1 January 1703 and major-general on 3 April 1705. He served in Portugal and Spain during the War of the Spanish Succession, where he was Governor of Lerida and Lieutenant-General of the King of Spain's army. He was killed fighting the French at the Battle of St Estevan in January 1706.

Family 
He was the only surviving son of Sir Albert Conyngham and Margaret Leslie. By his wife Mary, widow of Charles Petty, 1st Baron Shelburne and daughter of Sir John Williams, 2nd Baronet, of Minster and Susan Skipwith, he had two sons, William (died  1738) and Henry Conyngham, 1st Earl Conyngham, and an only surviving daughter, Mary Conyngham, who married Francis Burton. Their son Francis Conyngham, 2nd Baron Conyngham, was an ancestor of the Marquesses Conyngham, who also inherited the Minster estate.

Notes

References 
 – 1625 to 1649
 – 1689 to 1694

17th-century births
1706 deaths
6th (Inniskilling) Dragoons officers
8th King's Royal Irish Hussars officers
British military personnel of the War of the Spanish Succession
British military personnel killed in the War of the Spanish Succession
Henry
Irish MPs 1692–1693
Irish MPs 1695–1699
Irish MPs 1703–1713
Members of the Parliament of Ireland (pre-1801) for County Donegal constituencies